William Terrence Hennessey (born 1 September 1942) is a Welsh former international footballer who gained 39 caps for Wales. He played as a defender and made 400 Football League appearances in the 1960s and 1970s with Birmingham City, Nottingham Forest and Derby County.

After his playing career, he managed a number of clubs, including Tulsa Roughnecks of the North American Soccer League, whom he led to the league championship in 1983.

Playing career
He joined Birmingham City as a junior, going on to make 178 League appearances for them, as well as being part of the team that won the 1962–63 Football League Cup.

In November 1965, he was transferred to Nottingham Forest and became their captain. He transferred from Forest to Derby County in February 1970 for a fee of £100,000. While at Derby he was part of the side that won the First Division in 1971–72. His role on the field varied. During his career Hennessey accumulated a total of 400 league appearances, as well as being capped by Wales on 39 occasions.

Coaching career
Hennessey was forced to retire at the end of the 1972–73 campaign and initially went into coaching. After taking a position (for the second time) as an assistant coach of Tulsa Roughnecks in 1980, he took over as manager mid-season in 1981, replacing Charlie Mitchell.

In 1983 Hennessey led Tulsa to the NASL championship, winning Soccer Bowl '83 by a 2–0 score over Toronto Blizzard. However, the team's financial instability led him to resign after the season.

References

External links

Nigel's Webspace

1942 births
Living people
Sportspeople from Wrexham County Borough
Welsh footballers
Wales under-23 international footballers
Wales international footballers
Association football defenders
English Football League players
Birmingham City F.C. players
Nottingham Forest F.C. players
Derby County F.C. players
Tamworth F.C. players
Shepshed Dynamo F.C. players
Welsh football managers
Tamworth F.C. managers
Melbourne Knights FC managers
North American Soccer League (1968–1984) coaches
Welsh expatriate football managers
Expatriate soccer managers in the United States
Expatriate soccer managers in Australia
Welsh expatriate sportspeople in Australia
Welsh expatriate sportspeople in the United States